Toonerville Rifa 13, also known as The Ville, is a Mexican-American street gang located in Los Angeles county.

History
Toonerville Rifa 13 was formed in the 1930s in North East Los Angeles and South Glendale.  Prior to taking the name of Toonerville in the early 1940s, the gang was known as the "Latin Souls."  The change to "Toonerville" came in the 1940s and named after the Pacific Electric Railway trolley that used to run through Atwater Village and South Glendale.  The Pacific Electric Trolley was referred to by locals as the "Toonerville Trolley," after the cartoon trolley featured in the Toonerville Folks comic strip.  Around 1960s and 1970s, Toonerville was known to be involved in drive by shootings, homicides, robberies, assaults and burglaries within Glendale.

One of the members, Timothy Joseph McGhee, was sentenced to death in 2009 for his role in three separate homicides. Additionally, he is suspected of taking part in as many as twelve murders in the Los Angeles area. TVR 13 claims Atwater Village as its turf.

See also
 List of California street gangs

References

External links
Timothy McGhee laughs during sentencing
Gang leader convicted of murders Timothy Mcghee may face death in killing of rivals
LAPD detectives, U.S. marshals and local authorities capture Timothy McGhee, sought in 12 vicious killings in the Atwater Village area
L.A. police hunt allegedly murderous gang leader
Toonerville gang injunction
Toonerville gang injunction map

Organizations established in the 1930s
1930s establishments in California
Sureños
Latino street gangs
Gangs in Los Angeles
Mexican-American culture in Los Angeles
Atwater Village, Los Angeles